Phil Croyle (October 30, 1949 – May 30, 2020) was an American football linebacker. He played for the Houston Oilers from 1971 to 1973 and for the Buffalo Bills in 1973.

He died of cancer on May 30, 2020, in San Jose, California at age 70.

References

1949 births
2020 deaths
People from North Chicago, Illinois
Players of American football from Illinois
American football linebackers
California Golden Bears football players
Houston Oilers players
Buffalo Bills players
Deaths from cancer in California